USS Helvetia (SP-3096) was a United States Navy patrol vessel in commission from 1918 to 1919.

Helvetia was built as a civilian three-masted schooner of the same name in 1905 by I. L. Snow & Company at Rockland, Maine. The U.S. Navy inspected her in July 1918 for possible naval service and purchased her on 19 July 1918 from R. K. Snow for use as a section patrol boat during World War I. She was commissioned the same day at Norfolk, Virginia, as USS Helvetia (SP-3096).

Assigned to the 5th Naval District, Helvetia initially was deployed as a decoy ship teamed with a U.S Navy submarine following her during antisubmarine patrols off the United States East Coast. It was hoped that her innocent appearance would lure unsuspecting German submarines to the surface to attack her with gunfire, allowing the submerged U.S. Navy submarine nearby to torpedo and sink them. However, Helvetia never encountered a German submarine.

Helvetia later served as a stores ship and mother ship for submarines at Norfolk until November 1918. She then was transferred to New London, Connecticut, for similar duties there with the submarine force of the United States Atlantic Fleet.

The Navy sold Helvetia back to R. K. Snow in February 1919.

Bibliography
 
  (entry accidentally truncated and merged with that of the first )
 Haze Gray & Underway Helvetia (corrected version of Dictionary of American Naval Fighting Ships entry)

External links
 Department of the Navy Naval History and Heritage Command Online Library of Selected Images: U.S. Navy Ships: USS Helvetia (SP-3096), 1918-1919 Originally merchant sailing schooner Helvetia
 NavSource Online: Section Patrol Craft Photo Archive Helvetia (SP 3096)

Schooners of the United States Navy
Patrol vessels of the United States Navy
World War I patrol vessels of the United States
Auxiliary ships of the United States Navy
World War I auxiliary ships of the United States
Ships built in Rockland, Maine
1905 ships
Three-masted ships